The 1975 Estonian SSR Football Championship was won by Narva Baltika.

League table

References

Estonian Football Championship
Est
Football